San Borja is a district of the Lima Province in Peru, and one of the upscale districts that comprise the city of Lima.
Originally part of the district of Surquillo and San Isidro, it became officially established as a separate district on June 1, 1983. The new district took its name from a former hacienda (estate) which dominated the area.
The district's postal code is 41.
The current mayor (alcalde) is Marco Álvarez. 

San Borja, is a quiet setting, where it is pleasant to live, it is classified within the top 5 of best places to live in Lima by many means.

San Borja is one of the few districts of Lima which was planned from the beginning and developed in an orderly fashion.  This happened in a relatively short time, during the 1970s the area underwent massive population growth and by the early 1980s almost all the land had been built up. The district's parks and green areas can be clearly seen on the satellite photographs (see external link). It is considered a middle to high-class district.

San Borja can be easily accessed using Javier Prado Avenue (the most likely route if coming from Lima International Airport), Angamos Avenue or Aviación Avenue.  The Panamerican Highway marks the eastern border of the district and is the most direct route if coming from the north or the south of the country.

Most of the residential streets in this district are named after famous painters, artists, philosophers and, in general, such tasks, that is the case with calle Miguel Angel, calle Millet, calle Redon,  calle Monet,  calle Rousseau, calle Van Gogh, to name just a few.

Urban Distribution
San Borja is currently considered as a district largely of the upper, upper middle and middle class, thanks to its small size as a district and is very attractive thanks to its large areas where green areas and the environment are adored as it is the "Pentagonito" area. Considered as a district focused on sports, many parts are full of green areas, spaces for walks, bicycle paths and an outdoor gym, considered a residential district par excellence, with accessibility from various points of the city, it has modern and multiple dwellings economical offer.

It is a district crossed by important avenues such as Javier Prado Este, Aviation, Guardia Civil, San Luis and surrounded on the east side by the Panamericana Sur highway, it has the circulation axes of Av. San Borja Norte and San Borja Sur, as well as the Av. Of the Arts. In 2011, it began to circulate on an elevated road on Av. Aviación, Line 1 of the Lima Metro.

The Banco de la Nación Tower, the main headquarters of this institution, inaugurated in October 2015, with a height of 140 meters (30 floors) is also the tallest building in the city and in the country.
The Lima Convention Center, a complex also opened in October 2015, built especially for the meetings of the Annual Board of Governors of the International Monetary Fund and the World Bank and since then host to important national and international meeting events.
The Cultural Center of the Nation, which houses the National Library of Peru, the Great National Theater of Peru, the Museum of the Nation, the Ministry of Culture and the Ministry of Education. All these places are located on Av. Javier Prado Este at the intersection with Av. Aviation, where the Culture Station of the Lima Metro is also located.
Other important milestones are:

The Headquarters of the Peruvian Army and the Ministry of War, popularly known as "El Pentagonito", whose environment of large green areas is the site of intense sports practice, especially on weekends when roads are closed to vehicular traffic. It has an auditorium where great shows are performed.
The Happiness Park with its lagoon, water sources, open-air amphitheater and wide areas of recreation. It is also a great attraction center that is integrated into the Army Headquarters circuit.
The Eduardo Dibós Coliseum, an international sports venue, located at the intersection of Av. Aviación and Angamos Este.
The headquarters of the Naval Center of Peru, located in the 24 block of Av. San Luis, where events and children's birthdays are held.

The National Institute of Child Health (San Borja headquarters), located at Av. Javier Prado Este.
There are also two large shopping centers which are La Rambla on Av. Javier Prado Este and Real Plaza Primavera, on Av. Angamos Este on the edge of the Surquillo district; both have numerous department stores, supermarkets, restaurants, movie theaters and entertainment venues.

The main temple of the district is the parish of San Francisco de Borja, being also important the parishes of Santísimo Nombre de Jesús, Nuestra Señora de Gracia, San Leopoldo and Nuestra Señora de la Alegría.

Its main schools are the Almirante Guise Naval Lyceum, Santísimo Nombre de Jesús School, San Ignacio de Recalde School, Maria de los Angeles School, Manuel Gonzales Prada, San Francisco de Borja School, Maria Molinari School, Romeo Luna Victoria and Nuestra Señora del Rosario .

In San Borja there are 5 small human settlements: San Juan Masías (located on the border with the San Luis district, on Avenidas Canadá and Aviación); The Forest, Small Farmers Todos los Santos, the Forest of San Borja (the three located on the border with the Santiago de Surco district) and Santa Rosa (on the border with the Surquillo district). As in La Molina and Santiago de Surco, the houses in these human settlements are painted houses but keeping the "popular" style, others with no need for tarrage, and others with gardens, fences and even their own garages, since many of them They fall into the category of lower middle and lower (not to confuse lower class with poverty), and a large part of them are not considered as a vulnerable population.

Geography

San Borja is bordered by the districts of San Luis and La Victoria on the north, Santiago de Surco on the east and south, Surquillo on the southwest and San Isidro on the west. The Rio Surco (Surco river) traverses the district in a north–south direction.  This is not an actual river, it is a canal fed from the Rimac river and used to irrigate public parks.
The terrain is mostly flat, with a gentle downward east–west slope.

Climate
San Borja has a climate typical of the Peruvian coastal area.  The weather is mild, with warm summers and cool winters, and humid all year round. It never rains but during the months from June to October its streets dampen due to a fine drizzle, called "garúa" in Spanish.  During this period, the sky is constantly overcast.
The summer season lasts from December to April.

Geology
San Borja, as most of the rest of Metropolitan Lima, is built on the alluvial fan formed by the Rimac river during the Quaternary Period.  The river deposited up to 300 metres of rounded pebbles, coarse sand and small amounts of fine sand and silt in the valley.  Geologists call this type of soil conglomerate.
The probable earthquake intensity in the San Borja area is Grade VII in the Modified Mercalli scale.  This compares favourably with Grade IX in some areas of La Molina, Callao and Chorrillos.

Flora and fauna

San Borja has many well maintained and watered parks and green areas, there are about 10 square metres per person. royal poinciana and eucalyptus trees are very common in the district.

There is a large and varied bird population that include west Peruvian doves, pigeons, barn swallows, sparrows, hummingbirds, Peruvian sheartails, American robins, eagles, falcons, common kestrels, owls, black vultures, herons and parrots.

Population
According to the Peruvian Institute of Statistics, the age distribution of the population of San Borja is as follows:

History

There are two archaeological remains in San Borja: Huaca San Borja and Huaca Limatambo.  These were built in pre-Inca times.  The Surco river (an old irrigation canal), which traverses the district in a northeast to southwest direction, is also pre-Inca.

The Huaca San Borja was built by the Ichma culture, a loosely organised kingdom that developed in the Lurin and Rimac valleys, during the Late Intermediate Period (AD 1100–1475).  It is believed this kingdom was centered in Pachacamac.  This huaca is an 8 metre high truncated pyramid made of dried mud.  It is surrounded by a mud wall enclosing three out of the four sides of the huaca.  The perimeter wall was painted white originally.  There is a second inner perimeter wall that encloses rooms, corridors and platforms at different levels.  The site was abandoned at the beginning of the colonial period.  During the Republic, a house was built on top.  The huaca is now open for guided visits.  The Huaca Limatambo is as old as the Huaca San Borja.  However, Limatambo is not open to the public and archaeological studies are ongoing.

After the Spanish conquest and the foundation of the city of Lima in 1535, the land that includes modern San Borja was given to Antonio Picado, secretary of Francisco Pizarro.  After many change of hands, in 1568 the land was given to the Jesuit Order.

The Jesuits had an hacienda (estate) called "San Francisco de Borja y Aragon", later known as Hacienda "San Borja".  They grew potatoes, maize, grapes and vegetables for their own sustenance and to fund their charities.  They later donated 2% of their land to the Government.

During the War of the Pacific (1879–1883) a line of defense between Miraflores and the area known then as Monterrico Grande was constructed.  This line was the last obstacle between the Chilean army and the capital, Lima.  It was formed by a series of "reductos" (redoubts or strongholds), numbered from 1 to 10 and located at approximately 800 metre intervals.  Reductos Nos 6, 7 and 8 were located in San Borja, along the Surco river.  The battle took place on 15 January 1881, and it involved the areas between Reducto No 1 to Reducto No 5 (between Miraflores and Surquillo).  The Peruvian army was defeated.  Except for Reducto No 2 in Miraflores and Reducto No 5 in nearby Surquillo there are no visible remains of them. After this battle, the Hacienda San Borja was garrisoned by the Chilean army.

In 1949 the district of Surquillo was created, it included most of what is now San Borja.

The hacienda San Borja was later owned by the Brescia family, who continued to use the land for agricultural purposes.  In 1960 they sold the land to two developers: "Inversiones San Borja" and "Inmobiliaria Santa Marina S.A.", who started the urbanization process.

The first inhabitants of the new "Urbanización San Borja" were the priests of the Congregation of the Most Precious Blood, who moved there in August 1962.  The parish was established in the area limited by the San Borja Sur, Aviación and Javier Prado avenues and the Surco river.  The first families came to live in San Borja in May–June 1964.  Back then it was still possible to see maize fields, cows, sheep dogs and many empty land plots.  The tall eucalyptus trees seen today in San Borja Norte Avenue also date from those early days.

The first school, San Francisco de Borja, was opened in 1968.
According to the parish records, in 1973 there were about 400 families living in San Borja.  In 1974, this figure increased to almost 4000 families, or about 16000 inhabitants.

San Borja separated from Surquillo and became officially established as a district on 1 June 1983.

The area north of Javier Prado Avenue between San Luis and Circunvalación Avenues, originally part of San Luis, were added later.

Education, Sports and Recreation

The following schools are located in the district:
 Colegio "Santísimo Nombre de Jesús"
 Colegio "San Francisco de Borja"
 Colegio "Liceo Naval Almirante Guise" which is a member of the International Baccalaurete since 1999
 Colegio "María Molinari"
 Colegio "San Ignacio de Recalde", which is a member of the International Baccalaurete since 2007
 Colegio "Santa Rosa de Lima"

San Borja is the home of the "Coliseo Dibos".

Government Institutions

Among the government institutions that are located in San Borja we can mention:

Ministry of Defense

The General Headquarters of the Army are located in San Borja. Often referred to as the Pentagonito or Little Pentagon, it is located in the southeastern part of the district. Its architecture is typical of that of the military government of the 1970s. The outer perimeter of 4.5 km is a very popular circuit for joggers and runners, and during weekends its adjacent streets are closed for jogging and other sports events.

Museo de la Nacion

The "Museo de la Nacion" is located on the north-west of the district on the corner between Javier Prado and Aviación avenues and very near to the National Library.  It is Lima's largest museum.  The building was initially constructed to be the Ministry of Fisheries.  Its architecture is typical of the military government of the 1970s.  It was later used by the National Bank but in 1990 was re-opened as the National Museum.  The Museum comprises four floors of exhibitions, all in chronological order.  The exhibition starts on the ground floor with pre-historical Peru and ends with the Inca Empire on the top floor. There is a very large collection of pre-colonial (before 1532) objects such as pottery, sculptures, mummies, textiles, weapons, tools, sacred idols and jewelry.  A series of three-dimensional scale models and aerial photographs of the country's main archaeological sites and replicas of the houses, clothing and artwork in ancient Peru are exhibited.  The main ancient Peruvian cultures like Chavin, Paracas, Moche, Nasca, Wari, Tiahuanaco, Chimu, and Inca are all represented and explained.  There is a permanent exhibition of a replica of the "Lord of Sipan" tomb.  Guides in Spanish, French and English are available.

The National Library (Biblioteca Nacional)

The "Biblioteca Nacional" is on the corner between Javier Prado and Aviación avenues and very near to the National Museum.
The National Library was established in 1821, the same year Peru was declared independent.  It was originally located in Central Lima.  During the War of the Pacific, the Chilean occupation army stole most of the works the library possessed.  The Library Director is currently trying to identify and recover some of the stolen works from the Chilean authorities.
After many years the new building in San Borja was completed and the Library moved there in 2006.  The new building has all the modern facilities such as a theater, an amphitheater, cafeteria, exhibition halls, 12 reading rooms with internet connections, storage areas and administrative offices.  Security is provided by a CCTV network and a modern fire control system.  The Library contains the "Hemeroteca Nacional", the biggest collection of newspapers and magazines in the country.  Their website has an online catalogue and a "Virtual Library".

Peruvian Institute of Nuclear Energy
Its main goal is to promote and supervise the applications of nuclear energy in the country.  It was created in 1975.

Ministry of Education

Ministry of Energy and Mines 
It is an entity of the Peruvian government responsible for managing the energy and mining sectors of Peru. Additionally, it is charged with overseeing the equal distribution of energy throughout the country.

National Institute for Child Health 
The new building for the National Institute for Child Health is located at the Rosa Toro Avenue.

Heads of local government 

 2019-2022
 Mayor: Alberto Tejada Noriega, Popular Action (Peru) (AP).
 Councillors: Nori Paz Arrascue (AP), Alonso Roel Alva (AP), Jorge Valencia Corominas (AP), Rocío Miranda Gonzales (AP), Mauricio Wong Quevedo (AP), Gonzalo Sáenz Raez (AP), Mariano Marquina Ulloa (AP), Julissa Gómez Vargas (AP), Óscar Urbina Núñez (Somos Perú), Gabriela Pachas Mendez (Somos Perú), Viviana Meza Gutiérrez (PPC).

International relations

San Borja District is twinned with:
 Ramat Gan, Israel

References

External links
 Municipalidad de San Borja - San Borja district council official website
 Google satellite view of San Borja: 
 www.sanborja.com - A website about San Borja
 Aves de Lima Metropolitana - Birds seen in Metropolitan Lima
 Aves de San Borja - Birds in San Borja

Districts of Lima